Antipathozoanthus is a genus of macrocnemic zoanthid in the family Parazoanthidae.

References

Further reading
Swain, Timothy D., and Laura M. Swain. "Molecular parataxonomy as taxon description: examples from recently named Zoanthidea (Cnidaria: Anthozoa) with revision based on serial histology of microanatomy." Zootaxa 3796.1 (2014): 81-107.
Bo, Marzia, et al. "Black coral assemblages from Machalilla National Park (Ecuador)." Pacific Science 66.1 (2012): 63–81.

Animals described in 2010
Parazoanthidae
Hexacorallia genera